Buffalo Prairie is a Census-designated place in Rock Island County, Illinois, United States. Buffalo Prairie has a post office with ZIP code 61237.

Demographics

Buffalo Prairie had a population of 64 as of the 2020 United States Census.

Notable people
Margo Price, country singer and songwriter

References

Unincorporated communities in Rock Island County, Illinois
Unincorporated communities in Illinois